Gali Jagir is a village of Attock District in the Punjab province of Pakistan. It is located at 33.4312° N, 72.6299° E on an altitude of 512 metres.

References

Villages in Attock District
Villages in Pakistan